Botswana is a Christian majority nation. However, the country is officially secular and allows freedom of religious practice. 

A country of an estimated 2.26 million people in 2015, Christianity arrived in Botswana in mid 1870s, with the arrival of Christian missionaries. The conversion process was quicker than neighboring southern African countries because regional hereditary tribal chiefs locally called Dikgosi converted to Christianity, which triggered the entire group they led to convert as well.

History 
Before the arrival of Christianity, Animism was the prevailing belief system of the country.

Later the Dikgosi converted in the belief that the Christian missionaries would help them source guns to resist Afrikaner trekkers from south as well as  help resist imperialist white foreigners. Some scholars place the initial contacts between Christian missionaries and Bechuanaland (the old name of Botswana) a few decades earlier.

After the arrival of Christianity in Botswana, the missionaries established Bible schools and attempted to end old practices such as Bogwera (the tribe's traditional initiation ceremony into manhood) and Bojale (a girl's initiation ceremony into womanhood after she reached puberty), both of which were traditionally linked to the social acceptance of someone's readiness to marry as well the right to inherit property. These practices continued to be in vogue in private, despite missionary efforts to end them. The Christian missionaries, particularly the London Missionary Society, were politically involved as interpreters between the tribal chiefs and the colonial administrators.

After Botswana gained independence in 1966 from the colonial rule, senior Christian mission officials and Reverends served as the first Speaker of the National Assembly and as officials in the new government. In 1970s, its new leaders reviewed the Christian colonial curriculum in schools, revised it in order to restore traditional values based on pre-Christian religious ideas, such as Kagisanyo and Botho, respectively harmony and humanism. Bogwera and Bojale were re-introduced. The new leaders also adopted a policy of religious tolerance and freedom, an approach towards religion in Botswana that continues in the 21st century. However, the school curriculum remains largely as before, with Christian terminology and ideologies.

An estimated 70 percent of Botswana citizens in 2001 identified themselves as Christians. In 2006, a Botswana government published report listed 63 percent of its citizens were Christians of various denominations, about 27 percent said their religion was “God,” about 8 percent claimed to have no religion, 2 percent were adherents of the traditional indigenous religion Badimo, and all other religious groups (Buddhism, Hindu, Islam, Judaism, others) in total were less than 1 percent of Botswana population. Of the others category, Muslims were 0.4% and Hindus were 0.3% of the total population.

The constitution of Botswana protects the freedom of religion and allows missionaries and proselytizers to work freely after they register with the government, but forced conversion is against the law. There is no state religion in Botswana.

Botswana recognizes only Christian holidays as public holidays. The nationwide religious observations include Good Friday, Easter Monday, Ascension Day, and Christmas.

See also
Badimo
Bahá'í Faith in Botswana
Botswana Council of Churches
Christianity in Botswana
Roman Catholicism in Botswana
The Church of Jesus Christ of Latter-day Saints in Botswana
Dutch Reformed Church in Botswana
Freedom of religion in Botswana
Hinduism in Botswana
Irreligion in Botswana
Islam in Botswana

References